Rafael Alejandro Marchan (born February 25, 1999) is a Venezuelan professional baseball catcher for the Philadelphia Phillies of Major League Baseball (MLB). Marchan signed with the Phillies organization as an amateur free agent in 2015, at age 16. Originally an infielder, he converted to catcher and impressed scouts and coaches early in his minor league career with his prowess on defense.

He returned to the minor leagues before the start of the 2021 season.

Early life 
Marchan was born on February 25, 1999, in San Cristóbal, Táchira, Venezuela. He grew up playing baseball, primarily as a shortstop, a popular position among Venezuelan adolescents hoping to break into professional baseball, and his childhood role model was Venezuelan shortstop Omar Vizquel. Shortly before his 16th birthday, he was encouraged by a handful of scouts to try catching, which would encourage his chances of being taken by a Major League Baseball (MLB) team. He made his catching debut at an under-15 baseball tournament in Mexico during the summer of 2015, which caught the attention of a number of international MLB scouts. The Philadelphia Phillies of MLB ultimately signed Marchan as an international free agent in July 2015 for a signing bonus of $200,000.

Career

Minor leagues 
After spending the end of the 2015 baseball season practicing catching in the Florida Instructional League, Marchan spent 2016 with the Dominican Summer League (DSL) Phillies, predominantly catching but with some appearances at first base. In 44 games for the DSL Phillies, he batted .333 with 34 runs batted in (RBI) in 171 at bats. He spent the following year with the Gulf Coast League (GCL) Phillies, batting .238 with 10 RBI in only 30 games and 84 at bats.

In 2018, Marchan was promoted to the Williamsport Crosscutters of the Class A Short Season New York-Penn League (NYPL), where he drew praise from his coaches as both a catcher and a batter: in addition to improving his ability to handle pitchers and call games from behind the plate, by the NYPL All-Star game in August, the switch-hitting Marchan was batting .297 left-handed and .325 right-handed. Marchan appeared at the All-Star Game that summer, successfully reaching base in five of his six plate appearances. At the end of the year, leading the team with nine stolen bases and fourth in the NYPL with a .301 batting average, Marchan was named the Crosscutters' most valuable player (MVP).

Following his performance with Williamsport, Marchan was promoted to the Low-A Lakewood BlueClaws to start the 2019 season, forming a catching platoon with fellow prospect Abrahan Gutierrez. On July 30, after batting .271 in 63 games for Lakewood, the Phillies promoted Marchan to the Class A-Advanced Clearwater Threshers of the Florida State League. Between the two teams, Marchan batted .261 in 85 minor-league games in 2019, with 23 RBI and two stolen bases. Despite hitting .285 with a .687 on-base plus slugging (OPS) thus far in his minor league career, as well as a .988 fielding percentage and successfully picking off 36 percent of attempted base stealers, there was some concern from SABRmetrics analysts that, after 846 plate appearances and four full seasons in Minor League Baseball (MiLB), Marchan had yet to hit a home run. Marchan was left unprotected in that November's Rule 5 Draft, but was unclaimed by other MLB teams, in part because he was only 21 years old and had not played in Double A or higher.

Philadelphia Phillies 
After impressing manager Joe Girardi, himself a former catcher, Marchan was invited to the Phillies' 2020 spring training. Rather than being poised for a promotion, the team used the opportunity to observe him in action and give him advice: for example, while catching bullpen sessions for major league pitchers like Aaron Nola and Ranger Suárez, Marchan's coaches would watch to see if he was giving away the pitches he called by taking on certain stances. When the COVID-19 pandemic forced the cancellation of the 2020 minor league season, Marchan was one of several Phillies prospects invited to practice at an alternate training site in Allentown, Pennsylvania, where he was available for a major league call-up in case something happened to Phillies catchers J. T. Realmuto or Andrew Knapp. When Realmuto began to experience hip soreness that September, prior to a doubleheader against the Miami Marlins, Marchan was called up between games 1 and 2. He made his MLB debut the next day, recording a single in the third inning for his first major league hit. At 21 years and 202 days old, Marchan was the youngest catcher to start in an MLB game during his debut, 109 days younger than Alejandro Kirk when the latter started behind the plate for the Toronto Blue Jays two days earlier. Four days later, Marchan hit his first career home run. Because no fans were allowed in Citizens Bank Park, the Phillies had been commemorating all home runs in 2020 by placing a cardboard cutout of the player in the location where the ball had landed; with no picture of Marchan available on such short notice, they instead drew a stick figure with the name "Marchan" on a piece of cardboard to mark the landing site for his home run. Marchan went 4-for-8 in three MLB games during the protracted 2020 season, and at the end of the year, Baseball America named hiim the Phillies' fifth-highest prospect.

Ultimately, the Phillies did re-sign Realmuto and Marchan entered spring training 2021 behind both Realmuto and Andrew Knapp on the team's depth chart at catcher. Marchan sustained a hamstring injury during spring training and ultimately was sent to minor league camp in late March. Marchan began the 2021 season with the Lehigh Valley Iron Pigs of Triple-A East for whom he batted .203, but was demoted to the Reading Fightin Phils of Double-A Northeast. He returned to the Major Leagues in August 2021 and started at catcher as Realmuto and Knapp both struggled with injuries.

Marchan began the 2022 season in Triple-A after not making the Opening Day roster out of spring. On April 7, 2022, Marchan was placed on the 60-day injured list with a left hamstring strain. On June 12, Marchan was activated from the injured list and optioned to Lehigh Valley.

Personal life
Marchan resides in Caracas, Venezuela. His hobbies include playing basketball and spending time at the beach.

References

External links

Living people
1999 births
People from San Cristóbal, Táchira
Major League Baseball players from Venezuela
Venezuelan expatriate baseball players in the United States
Major League Baseball catchers
Philadelphia Phillies players
Dominican Summer League Phillies players
Venezuelan expatriate baseball players in the Dominican Republic
Florida Complex League Phillies players
Williamsport Crosscutters players
Lakewood BlueClaws players
Clearwater Threshers players
Lehigh Valley IronPigs players
Reading Fightin Phils players